Brian Molko (born 10 December 1972) is a Belgian-born Scottish-American musician and songwriter. He is best known as the lead vocalist, guitarist, and lyricist of the band Placebo. He is known in particular for his distinctive nasal, high-pitched vocals, previously feminine/androgynous appearance, aggressive guitar style, and unique tunings.

Early life
Molko was born in Brussels, Belgium, to an American Jewish father of French and Italian heritage and a Scottish mother. He has an older brother named Stuart. Molko's family moved frequently during his childhood due to his father's career as a banker; the family lived in Dundee in Scotland, Liberia, Lebanon, the village of Longeau in Belgium, before eventually settling in the town of Sandweiler, in Luxembourg.

Although Molko was brought up in a strict household that disapproved of artistic expression (his father wanted him to become a banker), he rebelled by assuming an androgynous image, wearing nail polish, lipstick, and eyeliner, and listening to punk music.
He initially attended the European School of Luxembourg (ESL), but left because he was bullied. He completed his secondary education at the American International School of Luxembourg (AISL), before studying drama at Goldsmiths College in London.

Career

Although Molko and Placebo co-founder Stefan Olsdal had both attended the American International School of Luxembourg (AISL), they had not been friends. When Molko was living in London, he ran into Olsdal at South Kensington tube station and invited him to one of his gigs he played with Steve Hewitt in a group called Ashtray Heart.

Along with Hewitt and Olsdal, Molko had a role in the 1998 film Velvet Goldmine, for which Placebo performed the T. Rex song "20th Century Boy". He played Malcolm, a singer of the fictional glam rock band, "The Flaming Creatures", who resembled the early Alice Cooper band.

During Placebo's live performances Molko has played a number of instruments, including guitar, bass guitar, keyboards, harmonica and saxophone.

Personal life

Molko is openly bisexual, a theme which was reflected in some of his earlier lyrics with Placebo. Molko was previously in a relationship with Helena Berg with whom he has a son, Cody Molko, who was born in 2005. Cody is now an actor and appeared in the television series The Drowning.

Molko has been open about his use of recreational drugs: in a 1997 interview with Kerrang! magazine he admitted that heroin was "probably the only drug on this planet I haven't tried". However, he later admitted to using heroin as well. Pharmaceutical drugs are also referenced, as evidenced by the band's name as well as the album Meds and its title track. Molko admitted in 2003 that many of his initial excesses were due to his mental health issues; he was officially diagnosed with major depressive disorder in his late twenties. He claimed in 2016 that he gave up drugs completely after the recording and release of Meds.

Molko speaks fluent French and English.

In December 2012 Molko received an Honorary Fellowship from Goldsmiths College, University of London.

In March 2021 Brian was featured in Marc Jacobs "Heaven" collection with a campaign shot taken by Harley Weir.

Collaborations
He has performed, as a guest vocalist and with other artists on Placebo's records, on tracks by:
The Cure – "If Only Tonight We Could Sleep" (live)
Justin Warfield – "Spite & Malice"
Losers – "Summertime Rolls"
Asia Argento – "Je T'aime, Moi Non Plus" (Serge Gainsbourg and Jane Birkin cover)
Alison Mosshart from The Kills – "Meds"
Michael Stipe of R.E.M. – "Broken Promise"
Faultline & Françoise Hardy – "Requiem for a Jerk" (Serge Gainsbourg cover)
Timo Maas – "Pictures", "Like Siamese", "First Day", "College 84"
Kristeen Young – "No Other God" on X
Dream City Film Club – "Some", "Billy Chic"
Jane Birkin – "Smile"
T. Rex – "20th Century Boy" (live cover, feat. David Bowie), "Without You I'm Nothing"
AC Acoustics – "Crush"
Alpinestars – "Carbon Kid"
Trash Palace – "The Metric System"
Hotel Persona – "Modern Kids"
Indochine – "Pink Water 3"
Prova Symphonica conducted by Michel Bisceglia – "Across the Universe" (The Beatles cover), "Ne me quitte pas" (Jacques Brel cover, both live)
Westbam – "Sick"
Fiona Brice – "West End Girls" (Pet Shop Boys cover)
Trash Palace – "Can't Get You Out of My Head" (Kylie Minogue cover, live)
Blackfield – "Under My Skin" (Sirens Remix)

Molko wrote the English lyrics to "Pink Water 3", a song by Indochine from the album Alice & June, released in 2005.

Molko was friends with David Bowie; Bowie sang on Placebo's "Without You I'm Nothing" and on the "20th Century Boy" cover live.

Equipment
Molko uses a variety of guitars. In the Sleeping With Ghosts era, he used Gibson SGs ("The Bitter End", "Every You Every Me", "Plasticine", "Black-Eyed", "Without You I'm Nothing", "Special K", "Bulletproof Cupid", "Soulmates/Sleeping With Ghosts", "Special Needs", "This Picture"), Fender Jaguars ("Allergic", "Nancy Boy", "Bionic", "Centrefolds"), a Fender Thinline Telecaster ("Taste in Men"), a Fender Jazzmaster ("Pure Morning"), and a Fender Bass VI ("Slave to the Wage"). For amplification he used a Marshall 6100LM.

Through the Meds tour, he used Gretsch Duo Jets ("Infra-Red", "Because I Want You", "Song to Say Goodbye", "One of a Kind", "The Bitter End", "Running Up that Hill", "Special K"), Gibson SGs ("Special Needs", "Every You Every Me", "Black-Eyed", "Without You I'm Nothing"), a Fender Jaguar ("Drag", "Nancy Boy", "I Know"), a Fender Thinline Telecaster ("Twenty Years", "Taste in Men"), and a Gibson Chet Atkins SST ("Meds"). His amplifier was a Fender Twin Reverb.

In the Battle for the Sun tour, he still used Gretsch Duo Jets ("Devil in the Details", "Come Undone", "Follow The Cops Back Home"), a Gibson SG ("Bright Lights"), Fender Cyclone ("Ashtray Heart", "The Never-Ending Why", "Breathe Underwater", "Teenage Angst"), a Gibson Les Paul ("For What It's Worth", "Speak in Tongues", "Julien", "Meds"), a Fender Telecaster Thinline ("Kitty Litter"), and a Fender Toronado ("Battle for the Sun"). His pedalboard consisted of a Boss TU-2 chromatic tuner, Electro Harmonix Holy Grail reverb, MXR Phase 90 phaser, two Electro Harmonix Hot Tubes distortion units, Boss DD-3 delay, MXR Distortion + booster, MG Monovibe chorus/vibrato, Electro Harmonix No. 1 Echo delay and a Radial Loopbone effect chain switcher.

In 2010, he signed an endorsement contract to use Orange amps.

Filmography
Velvet Goldmine (1998) – Malcolm of The Flaming Creatures
Sue's Last Ride (2001) – executive producer

References

External links

Brian Molko's (Placebo) guitar rig

1972 births
Living people
Alumni of the European Schools
Alumni of Goldsmiths, University of London
Bisexual men
Bisexual singers
Bisexual songwriters
Musicians from Brussels
Scottish bisexual people
Scottish male songwriters
Scottish people of American descent
Scottish people of French descent
Scottish people of Italian descent
Scottish LGBT singers
Scottish LGBT songwriters
Belgian bisexual people
Belgian LGBT singers
Belgian LGBT songwriters
American bisexual people
American LGBT singers
American LGBT songwriters
American male songwriters
American people of Scottish descent
American people of French descent
American people of Italian descent
Placebo (band) members
21st-century Scottish male singers
21st-century American male singers
21st-century Belgian male singers
21st-century Belgian singers
20th-century Scottish LGBT people
21st-century Scottish LGBT people
20th-century American LGBT people
21st-century American LGBT people
20th-century Belgian LGBT people
21st-century Belgian LGBT people